This list of tallest buildings in Colombia ranks skyscrapers in Colombia by height. This lists ranks Colombia skyscrapers that stand at least 150 metres (492 feet) tall, based on standard height measurement. This includes spires and architectural details but does not include antenna masts.

The new current tallest building in Bogotá is the BD Bacatá, On June 2, 2015 it became taller than Torre Colpatria, which held the title of the tallest building in Colombia since 1979.

References

External links
 Skyscraper.com Colombia diagram

Tallest
 
Colombia